Closer is the second studio album by American rapper Mike Stud released on July 7, 2014.

Release and promotion

Singles 
A music video for the lead album single, "Out Here," was posted to YouTube on May 4, 2014. Prior to the album's release, Stud posted a music video for the album’s title track on his YouTube page. Both tracks were produced by Louis Bell.

Track listing
All tracks produced by Louis Bell.

Charts

References 

2014 albums
Hip hop albums by American artists
Atlantic Records albums